Bob le flambeur (English translation": "Bob the Gambler" or "Bob the High Roller") is a 1956 French heist gangster film directed by Jean-Pierre Melville and starring Roger Duchesne as Bob. It is often considered both a film noir and a precursor to the French New Wave, the latter because of its use of handheld camera and a single jump cut.

Plot
Bob is a gambler who lives on his own in the Montmartre district of Paris, where he is well-liked by the demi-monde community. A former bank robber and convict, he has mostly kept out of trouble for the past 20 years, and is even friends with a police commissioner, Ledru, whose life he once saved. Ever the gentleman, Bob lets Anne, an attractive young woman who has just lost her job, stay in his apartment in order to keep her from the attentions of Marc, a pimp he hates. Bob declines Anne's advances, instead steering her to his young protégé Paolo, who soon sleeps with her.

Through Jean, an ex-con who is now a croupier at the casino in Deauville, Bob's friend Roger, a safecracker, learns that, by 5:00 in the morning on the day of a big horse race at the nearby track, the casino safe is expected to contain around 800 million French francs in cash. As Bob has had a run of bad luck, he plans to rob the safe, convincing a man named McKimmie to finance the preparations and recruiting a team to carry out the heist. Jean gets detailed floor plans of the casino and the specifications of the safe, and buys a bracelet for his wife, Suzanne, with some of the money he is paid for his services.

The smitten Paolo brags to Anne about the upcoming raid to try to impress her. Not taking him seriously, she lets this information slip to Marc just before the two have sex. Earlier, Marc had been arrested by Ledru for beating up one of his prostitutes, but Ledru had released him on the condition that he provide some information on a bigger crime; Marc's reaction makes Anne realize she may have made a mistake.

The next morning, Anne tells Bob what she did, and he and Roger search for Marc, but cannot find him. Marc tells Ledru that he has heard about a caper involving Bob, but needs a few more hours to obtain confirmation, so Ledru lets him go. When Bob tells Paolo about Marc and Anne, the young man finds Marc and shoots the man dead just as he is about to tell Ledru what he was able to find out. Meanwhile, Suzanne discovers where her husband got the money to buy the bracelet and decides to ask Bob for a larger share of the take. They drive to Paris, but are unable to find him or Roger. She then persuades Jean to back out of it and anonymously tips off Ledru.

Thinking that, with Marc dead, their plan is still a secret, Bob and his team head to Deauville. Ledru searches fruitlessly for Bob to convince him to abandon his plan. He reluctantly leads a convoy of armed police to the casino.

Bob enters the casino to check on things. The plan is that, unless he signals them otherwise, his team will burst in at 5:00 a.m. and rob the safe at gunpoint. He had promised Roger that he would not gamble until after the heist was over, but, after wandering around for a while, he cannot resist placing a bet.  He has an incredible run of good luck, first at roulette, then at chemin de fer, and loses track of the time. Just before 5:00, he finally looks at his watch. He orders the staff to cash his huge pile of chips and hurries out the door. The police arrive as Bob's team are walking toward the casino, and a shootout ensues; Paolo is shot. Bob comes upon the aftermath and holds Paolo as he dies. He and Roger are handcuffed and put into Ledru's car, and Bob's winnings are put in the trunk. Ledru says Bob will probably only spend three years in prison, but Roger says that, with a good lawyer, he will get acquitted. Bob quips that he may even sue for damages.

Principal cast

 Isabelle Corey as Anne
 Daniel Cauchy as Paolo
 Roger Duchesne as Bob Montagné
 Guy Decomble as Commissioner Ledru
 André Garet as Roger
 Gérard Buhr as Marc
 Claude Cerval as Jean
 Colette Fleury as Suzanne
 René Havard as Inspector Morin
 Simone Paris as Yvonne
 Howard Vernon as McKimmie

The voice of the narrator is that of Jean-Pierre Melville.

Production
The film was shot on location in Paris and Deauville, with two interiors filmed at Melville's own Studios Jenner. According to an interview, the film cost 17.5 million French francs to produce, though a CNC Censorship file includes an estimate of 32 million French francs.

Release
Released in Paris on 24 April 1956, Bob le flambeur took in 221,659 admissions in Paris and 716,920 admissions in France as a whole, and was Melville's lowest grossing film at that point in his career.

Critical reception

Vincent Canby, writing for The New York Times in 1981, noted that "Melville's affection for American gangster movies may have never been as engagingly and wittily demonstrated as in Bob le Flambeur, which was only the director's fourth film, made before he had access to the bigger budgets and the bigger stars (Jean-Paul Belmondo, Alain Delon) of his later pictures."

The film received positive reviews when it was re-released by Rialto Pictures in U.S. cinemas in 2001. Roger Ebert added it to his Great Movies list in 2003.

On Rotten Tomatoes, the film holds an approval rating of 97%, based on 30 reviews, with an average rating of 8.1/10; the website's critical consensus reads: "Majorly stylish, Bob le Flambeur is a cool homage to American gangster films and the presage to French New Wave mode of seeing."

Remake and influence
The Good Thief, an English-language remake of the film written and directed by Neil Jordan, was released in 2002.

Bob le flambeur also has influenced such films as the two versions of the American film Ocean's Eleven (1960 and 2001) and Paul Thomas Anderson's Hard Eight (1996).

References

Sources

External links
 
 
 
 Bob le flambeur an essay by Lucy Sante at the Criterion Collection
 "Bob le Flambeur", Senses of Cinema, February 2003, Brian Frye

1956 films
1956 crime films
Film noir
Films about organized crime in France
Films directed by Jean-Pierre Melville
French black-and-white films
Films about gambling
French gangster films
French heist films
Films set in Paris
Films produced by Serge Silberman
Films based on French novels
1950s heist films
1950s French-language films
1950s French films